The European Netball Championship (also known as the Netball Europe Championships) is an annual netball competition organised by Netball Europe. The Championships or "Open" section features the highest-ranked European nations, and the "Challenge" section features teams below that level. Occasionally under 21 and under 17 divisions have been incorporated in the competition.

History
The 2013 Championship title was won by Wales, the first time England had not won. England were runners up with Northern Ireland third. Fourth place were Scotland. The English side is usually made up of players not picked for the national team in major tournaments like the World Cup and Commonwealth Games. The Challenge was won by Ireland. Switzerland were runners up with Gibraltar third.

The 2014 Championship title was won by Wales with England not sending a team. Runners up were Scotland with Northern Ireland third. Fourth place were Ireland.

The 2015 saw the first competition with guest teams. Championship title was won by England. Runners up were South Africa with Northern Ireland third. Fourth place were Wales. Fifth place was Trinidad and Tobago with Scotland sixth.

The 2016 saw the Championship title was won by England. Runners up were Wales with Scotland third. Fourth place were Northern Ireland. The Challenge was won by Grenada. Runners up were Ireland with United States third. Other countries playing were Gibraltar fourth, Malta fifth and Israel sixth.

The 2017 saw the Championship title was won by England. Runners up were Northern Ireland with Scotland third. Fourth place were Wales and fifth was Fiji.

Results

Championship

† Invited guest

Challenge

See also
Netball Europe

References

 2017 Results. Netball Europe webpage

 
International netball competitions
Netball competitions in Europe